Saint-Étienne-aux-Clos (Auvergnat: Sent Estefe deus Chaus) is a commune in the Corrèze department in central France.

Geography
The Chavanon forms most of the commune's eastern boundary.

Population

See also
Communes of the Corrèze department

References

Communes of Corrèze